Tom Swift is an American mystery drama television series based on the book series of the same name developed by 	Melinda Hsu Taylor, Noga Landau and Cameron Johnson. Starring Tian Richards, it is a spin-off of Nancy Drew. The series premiered on May 31, 2022 on The CW, with the series finale airing on August 2, 2022. In June 2022, it was canceled after one season.

Cast and characters

Main
 Tian Richards as Tom Swift, a young, billionaire inventor
 Ashleigh Murray as Zenzi Fullerton, Tom's cousin and best friend
 Marquise Vilsón as Isaac Vega, Tom's bodyguard
 Albert Mwangi as Rowan, a Congressman's security detail
 April Parker Jones as Lorraine Swift, Tom's mother

Recurring

 LeVar Burton as voice of Barclay, an artificial intelligence
 Brittany Ishibashi as Claire Cormier
 Ward Horton as Nathan Eskol, a family friend of the Swift family who is a Congressman
 Donovin Miller as Lino, Tom's adoptive brother
 Christopher B. Duncan as Barton Swift, Tom's father
 Hayward Leach as Justin Chase
 Elizabeth Cappuccino as Susannah Robb

Episodes

Production

Development
On October 28, 2020, it was announced that The CW was developing a spin-off from their Nancy Drew series titled Tom Swift. The series is based on the book series of the same name and is created and executive produced by Melinda Hsu Taylor, Noga Landau, and Cameron Johnson. The show is set in the "Drew-niverse". On February 8, 2021, it was announced that Ruben Garcia will be directing the pilot episode. On August 30, 2021, The CW had given the production a straight-to-series order and it was expected to debut during the 2021–22 television season. Josh Schwartz, Stephanie Savage, and Lis Rowinski were also added as executive producers.

Lead actor Richards said of the adaptation, "The original Tom Swift was great for his time and what he represented. At the time, that was the face of young boys, All-American kids full of possibilities. But in 2021, that can look so different. It can look like someone like me—a Black guy who is chocolate, who is queer, who is all those things that we're told aren't the normal or the status quo." He added, "We're going to dive into so many sectors of identity. We're going to talk about Blackness—and a different kind of Blackness than we're used to seeing, which is the Black elite, the 1 percent, the billionaires. We're also going to talk about a queer boy's journey into becoming a queer man. Not only self-acceptance, but acceptance as a whole, having the community and people around you."

The series started filming in Atlanta in late-January 2022, which was completed between late April-early May. It premiered on The CW on May 31, 2022. On June 30, 2022, the series was canceled after one season due to low viewership, although it was allowed to have the rest of the episodes for the season aired on The CW. The series finale aired on August 2, 2022.

Casting
On January 26, 2021, Tian Richards was cast in the titular role of Tom Swift. On May 11, 2021, LeVar Burton joined the main cast to voice an artificial intelligence named Barclay. Richards and Burton both appear as their respective characters in the May 2021 Nancy Drew episode "The Celestial Visitor". In February 2022, Ashleigh Murray, Marquise Vilsón, April Parker Jones, and Albert Mwangi joined the cast in starring roles. On March 8, 2022, Ward Horton was cast in a recurring role.

Reception

Critical response 
Caroline Framke, writing for Variety, said "Outside its flawed hero, though, “Tom Swift” suffers from a surprising lack of imagination given all the ostensibly impressive innovation at the heart of the Swift empire" but said the series should be given a chance to recover from a "shaky launch".

References

External links

2020s American black television series
2020s American drama television series
2020s American LGBT-related television series
2020s American mystery television series
2020s American science fiction television series
2022 American television series debuts
2022 American television series endings
American television spin-offs
The CW original programming
English-language television shows
Television series by CBS Studios
Television shows based on American novels
Television shows filmed in Atlanta
Television shows set in Nebraska
Tom Swift